Martin Mystère: Operation Dorian Gray (known as "Crime Stories: From the Files of Martin Mystere" in North America), is the only video game adaptation of the Italian sci-fi detective comic-book franchise called Martin Mystère, starring a detective and his assistant, Java. It is a point-and-click adventure game, published in 2005 by The Adventure Company in North America and GMX Media in Europe. A Macintosh version was planned, but was cancelled in the evaluation stage. Versions for PlayStation 2 and Xbox were also planned, but were also cancelled.

Plot
The player takes on the role of Martin Mystere, a young private eye who is looking into the brutal killing of Professor Eulemberg, a renowned scientist.

Gameplay
The gameplay is standard for graphic adventure games: search for items in order to solve logic puzzles.

Development
Development for the game began around 2002. Most of the time was invested on the storyboard, which was heavily based on the original comic strips of Martin Mystère. The models for the graphics started as layouts on paper. The models were output in Realtime 3D with octagonal views and pre-rendered backgrounds (Similar to Druuna: Morbus Gravis and Syberia) and animated with 3DS Max.
The game uses Direct3D retained mode that has been discontinued by Microsoft.

Critical reception

The game has a Metascore of 45% based on 20 critics.

Computer Gaming Magazine gave a scathing review describing the game as "tragic", adding that it was too over-enthusiastic. IGN deemed it "generic" and GameSpot called it "archaic". Game Chronicles thought the puzzles were illogical and the story didn't make sense.

References

External links

 Adventure Archiv review
 Gameboomers review
 Jeuxvideo review
 English homepage

2005 video games
Windows games
Windows-only games
Cancelled classic Mac OS games
Cancelled PlayStation 2 games
Cancelled Xbox games
Detective video games
Adventure games
Video games developed in Italy
Video games based on comics
Point-and-click adventure games
Science fiction video games
The Adventure Company games